In nuclear engineering, a prompt neutron is a neutron immediately emitted (neutron emission) by a nuclear fission event, as opposed to a delayed neutron decay which can occur within the same context, emitted after beta decay of one of the fission products anytime from a few milliseconds to a few minutes later.

Prompt neutrons emerge from the fission of an unstable fissionable or fissile heavy nucleus almost instantaneously. There are different definitions for how long it takes for a prompt neutron to emerge. For example, the United States Department of Energy defines a prompt neutron as a neutron born from fission within 10−13 seconds after the fission event. The U.S. Nuclear Regulatory Commission defines a prompt neutron as a neutron emerging from fission within 10−14 seconds.
This emission is controlled by the nuclear force and is extremely fast. By contrast, so-called delayed neutrons are delayed by the time delay associated with beta decay (mediated by the weak force) to the precursor excited nuclide, after which neutron emission happens on a prompt time scale (i.e., almost immediately).

Principle

Using uranium-235 as an example, this nucleus absorbs a thermal neutron, and the immediate mass products of a fission event are two large fission fragments, which are remnants of the formed uranium-236 nucleus. These fragments emit two or three free neutrons (2.5 on average), called prompt neutrons. A subsequent fission fragment occasionally undergoes a stage of radioactive decay that yields an additional neutron, called a delayed neutron. These neutron-emitting fission fragments are called delayed neutron precursor atoms.

Delayed neutrons are associated with the beta decay of the fission products. After prompt fission neutron emission the residual fragments are still neutron rich and undergo a beta decay chain. The more neutron rich the fragment, the more energetic and faster the beta decay. In some cases the available energy in the beta decay is high enough to leave the residual nucleus in such a highly excited state that neutron emission instead of gamma emission occurs.

Importance in nuclear fission basic research

The   standard deviation of the final kinetic energy distribution as a function of mass of final fragments from low energy  fission of uranium 234 and uranium 236, presents a peak around light fragment masses region and another on heavy fragment masses region. Simulation by Monte Carlo method of these experiments suggests that those peaks are produced by prompt neutron emission. This effect of prompt neutron emission does not provide a primary mass and kinetic distribution which is important to study fission dynamics from saddle to scission point.

Importance in nuclear reactors

If a nuclear reactor happened to be prompt critical - even very slightly - the number of neutrons and power output would increase exponentially at a high rate. The response time of mechanical systems like control rods is far too slow to moderate this kind of power surge. The control of the power rise would then be left to its intrinsic physical stability factors, like the thermal dilatation of the core, or the increased resonance absorptions of neutrons, that usually tend to decrease the reactor's reactivity when temperature rises; but the reactor would run the risk of being damaged or destroyed by heat.

However, thanks to the delayed neutrons, it is possible to leave the reactor in a subcritical state as far as only prompt neutrons are concerned: the delayed neutrons come a moment later, just in time to sustain the chain reaction when it is going to die out. In that regime, neutron production overall still grows exponentially, but on a time scale that is governed by the delayed neutron production, which is slow enough to be controlled (just as an otherwise unstable bicycle can be balanced because human reflexes are quick enough on the time scale of its instability). Thus, by widening the margins of non-operation and supercriticality and allowing more time to regulate the reactor, the delayed neutrons are essential to inherent reactor safety and even in reactors requiring active control.

Fraction definitions

The factor β is defined as:

and it is equal to 0.0064 for U-235.

The delayed neutron fraction (DNF) is defined as:

These two factors, β and DNF, are not the same thing in case of a rapid change in the number of neutrons in the reactor.

Another concept, is the effective fraction of delayed neutrons, which is the fraction of delayed neutrons weighted (over space, energy, and angle) on the adjoint neutron flux. This concept arises because delayed neutrons are emitted with an energy spectrum more thermalized relative to prompt neutrons. For low enriched uranium fuel working on a thermal neutron spectrum, the difference between the average and effective delayed neutron fractions can reach 50 pcm (1 pcm = 1e-5).

See also

Prompt criticality
Critical mass
Nuclear chain reaction

References

External links
Hybrid nuclear reactors:delayed neutrons
Beta is not the delayed neutron (population) fraction

Nuclear technology
Prompt